Microchrysotus is a genus of fly in the family Dolichopodidae from Mexico.

Species
Microchrysotus mirabilis Robinson, 1964
Microchrysotus tarsalis Robinson, 1964

References

Medeterinae
Dolichopodidae genera
Diptera of North America
Endemic insects of Mexico
Taxa named by Harold E. Robinson